Guspini (Gùspini in Sardinian) is a town and comune of about 12,000 inhabitants in west Sardinia (Italy), in the province of South Sardinia.

Close to Guspini, at the mines of Montevecchio and Gennamari, galena and sphalerite were extracted in the past. Today the people at Guspini are concentrated on agriculture, on tourism and on smaller to middle enterprises. Close to Guspini are some well-built nuraghes and the Phoenician-Punic archaeological site of Neapolis.

History 
The first traces of human settlement in the area of Guspini trace back to prior the Nuragic period. Traces of Nuragic, Phoenician-Punic, Bizantine and Roman settlements have been found.

The town has a medieval structure with the Church of Santa Maria of Malta which was founded by the knights of the same order, as the most ancient trace. In the Middle Ages the town was part of the Giudicato of Arborea, whose rulers possessed a castle on a nearby mount built in 1100, on the Mount Arcuentu.

From the 19th century Guspini's history was strictly linked to the mines of Montevecchio.

Monuments and places of interest

Religious buildings 

 Church of San Nicola di Mira, built into a late gothic style in the first half of the 17th century. Its facade is characterized by a rose window. 
 Church of Santa Maria of Malta, built into romanic style in the 10th century: it was part of a monastery belonging to the Byzantine (Greek) Catholic Church.
 Church of San Pio X, built in 1966.
 Church of San Giovanni Bosco, built in 1977.

Civilian buildings 

 Casa Murgia
 Montegranatico
 Municipio (Town hall)

Archeology

Pre-Nuragic sites 

 Perdas Longas menhirs.
 Genna Prunas menhir close to the sacred well Sa Mitza de Nieddinu.
 domus de janas di Bruncu Maddeus near the nuraghe Bruncu e s'Orcu.

Nuragic sites

 more than 30 nuraghes such as Nuraghe Saurecci and Nuraghe Melas that are the most well preserved.
 2 sacred wells:
 sacred well Sa Mitza de Nieddinu (1.200-900 a.C.)
 sacred well of Is Trigas.

The other most interesting archeological site is the Phoenician-Punic and later Roman city of Neapolis.

Mines 

 Montevecchio mines.

Among the East mines:

 Piccalinna mine.
 Sant'Antonio mine.
 Sciria mine.

Among the West mines:

 Casargiu mine.
 Sanna mine.
 Telle mine.

Natural monuments 

 Columns of basalt, located inside the town.
 Sa rocca incuaddigada (translatable from the Sardinian as "The mounted rock"); it is a gigantic granitic rock placed on the slope of Mount Santa Margherita where the water springs Sa Tella and Sattai are also.

See also
 Montevecchio
 Arbus

External links

 Official website  

Cities and towns in Sardinia